Jewell Jones (born April 11, 1995) is an American politician from the state of Michigan. He served on the city council of Inkster, Michigan, and was elected to represent the 11th district of the Michigan House of Representatives as the youngest representative in state history. He is a member of the Democratic Party.

Early life and education
Jones's parents involved him in his church and in volunteering from a young age. He became a deacon in his family church. Jones graduated from John Glenn High School in Westland, Michigan, in 2013. He is a student at the University of Michigan–Dearborn, where he is pursuing a Dual-Degree in Business and Political Science. He participated in the Army Reserve Officers' Training Corps. During his years in school, he became involved in politics, working on the political campaigns of David Knezek for Michigan State Senate and Hilliard Hampton for mayor of Inkster, Michigan, in 2014. In 2015, at the age of 20, he was elected and sworn into the Inkster City Council, becoming the youngest councilperson in the city's history.

Career

Inkster City Council
Jones was elected to the Inkster City Council at the age of 20, becoming the youngest person to ever sit on the city council. As an Inkster City Councilman, Jones focused on the city's education system.

Michigan House of Representatives
Following the death of Julie Plawecki, the incumbent member of the Michigan House of Representatives for the 11th district, in 2016, Lauren Plawecki, her daughter, was the only candidate to file for the Democratic Party nomination in the special election to finish her term, which she won. However, precinct delegates selected Jones to be the Democratic Party's nominee for the 11th district in the 2016 general election. He won, receiving 66% of the vote against Republican Party nominee Robert Pope, and became the youngest State Representative in Michigan's history.

Personal life
Jones campaigned for Hillary Clinton in the 2016 election.

On May 26, 2018, Jones was pulled over for speeding, window tint, and having an obstructed license plate. He was cited for driving with open intoxicants, although officers stated that Jones and all of the passengers were sober. His arraignment for the misdemeanor charges was set for August 24, 2018.

On April 6, 2021, Jones was arrested on charges stemming from a motor vehicle accident.  Paramedics arrived first and observed a woman with her pants down, and Jones with his pants partially down.  When police arrived, Jones was charged with resisting and obstructing a police officer, operating a motor vehicle with high blood alcohol content, operating a motor vehicle while intoxicated, possession of a weapon under the influence of alcohol and reckless driving. During the arrest, Jones told officers that he would call governor Gretchen Whitmer, and warned the officers that he runs the state budget. Jones's attorney denied that he resisted the arrest, and said that his statements regarding the governor and the budget were made in an attempt to stop the officers from using excessive force.

On September 15, after being arraigned, Jones was found to have attempted to smuggle a handcuff key into the jail. The key was attached to the bottom of his foot, with clear tape.

Following his arrest, Jones was stripped of his committee assignments in September 2021.

References

External links

Jewell Jones at Michigan House Democrats

1995 births
Living people
Michigan city council members
African-American state legislators in Michigan
Democratic Party members of the Michigan House of Representatives
People from Inkster, Michigan
University of Michigan–Dearborn alumni
Military personnel from Michigan
21st-century American politicians
African-American city council members in Michigan
21st-century African-American politicians
Michigan politicians convicted of crimes